Newtonia camerunensis is a species of plant in the family Fabaceae. It is found only in Cameroon. Its natural habitat is subtropical or tropical dry forests.

References

camerunensis
Flora of Cameroon
Critically endangered plants
Taxonomy articles created by Polbot